Honeymoon Deferred may refer to:

Honeymoon Deferred (1940 film), American B-mystery directed by Lew Landers
Honeymoon Deferred (1951 film), British-Italian comedy directed by Mario Camerini